This is a list containing the Billboard Hot Latin Tracks number-ones of 2008.

Chart history

References

United States Latin Songs
2008
2008 in Latin music